Risoba vitellina is a species of moth of the family Nolidae first described by Frederic Moore in 1882. It is found in India.

References

Nolidae
Moths of Asia
Moths described in 1882